The 1970–71 WCHL season was the fifth season of the Western Canada Hockey League (WCHL). Ten teams completed a 66-game season, with the Edmonton Oil Kings winning the President's Cup.

League business
The Medicine Hat Tigers were approved as an expansion team in January 1970, for the upcoming 1970–71 season. The Regina Pats were accepted into the WCHL, which increased league to ten teams by May 1970. League president Ron Butlin stated that the expansion draft was configured so that new teams would be competitive in their first year. Established teams could protect six players before expansion teams could then start drafting from the rest.

The Canadian Amateur Hockey Association (CAHA) general meeting in May 1970 discussed proposals, in which the WCHL and Butlin were interested as part of rejoining the CAHA and disbanding the Canadian Hockey Association. Proposals included splitting junior ice hockey into two tiers, and readmitting the WCHL into the top tier along with the Quebec Major Junior Hockey League and the Ontario Hockey Association Major Junior A Series. The top tier teams would be eligible to compete for the Memorial Cup, receive greater development payments from the National Hockey League when players were drafted, and be allowed to select a limited number of players from lower-tier teams. 

On May 29, 1970, Justice Lieberman of the Alberta Supreme Court ruled in favour of the WCHL being paid C$13,200 in outstanding development payments from the CAHA for the 1968 NHL draft. Butlin was satisfied with the ruling and considered further court action to receive an additional $40,700 from the 1969 NHL draft.

On June 24, 1970, the WCHL and the CAHA signed a two-year agreement to reunite the organizations. The WCHL was admitted to the top tier of the CAHA, and would receive $100,000 in development grants for the 1970–71 season. The WCHL would pay a flat registration fee per team rather than a percentage of gate receipts, and would have direct representation on the CAHA junior council. The WCHL was expected to abide by any future CAHA-NHL agreements which included the renegotiation of draft payment amounts, and the CAHA agreed to distribute outstanding draft money. League expansion or relocation of teams were subject to CAHA approval, and the WCHL league champion qualified for the Memorial Cup final. The WCHL was allowed four over-age players in the upcoming season, then reduced to two over-age players in the second season onward. The WCHL was allowed to transfer up to six players between provinces per team from areas west of Ontario, and could draft a maximum of two players from a lower tier team.

In August 1970, Butlin announced an affiliation agreement with the British Columbia Junior Hockey League to develop prospect players for the WCHL. 

In October 1970, CAHA president Earl Dawson threatened to have the league expelled from the CAHA due to the use of over-age players who came from Ontario, and disputes with payments to lower tier teams. CAHA secretary Gordon Juckes later clarified that automatic release provisions would not be used in the 1970–71 season, and suggested alternate arrangements be made to settle disputes of roster movements between tiers.

In January 1971, the league set up an $8,000 scholarship for Ernie Heineman due to a career-ending eye injury.

The Edmonton Oil Kings issued a challenge to the Quebec Remparts to play for the 1971 Memorial Cup championship. The CAHA approved a best-of-three final with all three games played at the Quebec Coliseum. Edmonton failed to win a game and the Remparts won the Memorial Cup.

Butlin chose to resign as WCHL president on June 21, 1971, since he was not happy with how some of the team owners did business. He stated that he was cautious about expanding in to British Columbia, and claimed that several team owners had done negotiations without him. Butlin had one year remaining on his contract.

Regular season
The Medicine Hat Tigers were added to the West division, and the Regina Pats were added to the East division. The regular season was expanded to 66 games from 60.

Final standings

Scoring leaders
Note: GP = Games played; G = Goals; A = Assists; Pts = Points; PIM = Penalties in minutes

1971 WCHL playoffs

Quarterfinals
Winnipeg defeated Estevan 4 games to 2 with 1 tie
Flin Flon defeated Regina 4 games to 1 with 1 tie
Edmonton defeated Saskatoon 4 games to 1
Calgary defeated Swift Current 3 games to 0 with 2 ties

Semifinals
Flin Flon defeated Winnipeg 5 games to 2
Edmonton defeated Calgary 4 games to 2

Finals
Edmonton defeated Flin Flon 4 games to 1 with 1 tie

All-Star game

The 1970–71 WCHL All-Star Game was held in Winnipeg, Manitoba, with the WCHL All-stars defeating the Winnipeg Jets 4–3 before a crowd of 3,543.

Awards

All-star team
Goaltender: Ed Dyck, Calgary Centennials
Defenceman: Ron Jones, Edmonton Oil Kings
Defenceman: Len Frig, Calgary Centennials & Ed Sidebottom, Estevan Bruins (tied)
Centerman: Gene Carr, Flin Flon Bombers
Left winger: Rod Norrish, Regina Pats
Right winger: Chuck Arnason, Flin Flon Bombers

See also
1970 in sports
1971 in sports

Notes

References

External links
whl.ca

Western Hockey League seasons
WCHL